KQCA (channel 58) is a television station licensed to Stockton, California, United States, serving the Sacramento area as an affiliate of MyNetworkTV. It is owned by Hearst Television (as the company's only MyNetworkTV affiliate) alongside NBC affiliate KCRA-TV (channel 3). Both stations share studios on Television Circle off D Street in downtown Sacramento, while KQCA's transmitter is located in Walnut Grove, California.

History
The station first signed on the air on April 13, 1986, as KSCH. The first program to air on the station was a "preview" show hosted by Jim Finnerty and Lori Sequest. It was 51 percent owned by Schuyler Communications, Inc., and 49 percent by the SFN Companies. It originally operated as an independent station and aired classic television series from the 1950s, 1960s, and 1970s, as well as some daytime programs that were preempted by KCRA-TV and KXTV (channel 10). The station originally operated from studios located on West Weber Avenue in Stockton. KSCH was also the first station in the Sacramento market to provide stereo sound from its sign-on.

On August 9 of that year, SFN sold the station to Pegasus Broadcasting, which consisted of SFN management and outside investors; channel 58 along with three other television stations and three radio stations sold for $154 million. In 1988, the station moved its studios to a new building located on Gold Canal Drive in Rancho Cordova. In 1990, GE Capital, which had been one of the investors that formed Pegasus, purchased the company outright.

In 1993, GE Capital began shopping KSCH-TV for sale; in one potential proposal, both KSCH and Koplar Communications-owned KRBK (channel 31, now KMAX-TV) would have been sold to one buyer, who would have been able to sell off one of the stations to a noncompetitive entity. In 1994, Sacramento restaurant owner Wing Fat and Barbara Scurfield purchased KSCH-TV from GE Capital for $8 million. The new owners entered into a local marketing agreement with Kelly Broadcasting, then-owner of KCRA. KCRA had launched a 10 p.m. local newscast for the station the year before, and KCRA wanted to operate the station (but could not own it outright under FCC rules of the time).

Once the sale was approved, Kelly immediately made a series of changes. Channel 58 affiliated with the new UPN, and its call letters were changed to KQCA on February 1, branding as "Q58" (as opposed to a "UPN" and channel number/city branding with many other affiliates at the time). On January 5, 1998, it swapped affiliations with KMAX-TV and became an affiliate of The WB upon the acquisition of channel 31 by UPN. When Hearst-Argyle Television (which became Hearst Television in 2009) bought KCRA and its LMA with KQCA in 1999, the station dropped its "Q58" branding in favor of using its call letters and channel number. Hearst-Argyle bought KQCA outright in 2000 after the Federal Communications Commission (FCC) began allowing duopolies, creating the first duopoly in the market in the process; the station adopted the "WB 58" branding in September 2004.

On January 24, 2006, the Warner Bros. unit of Time Warner and CBS Corporation announced that the two companies would shut down The WB and UPN and combine the networks' respective programming to create a new "fifth" network called The CW. Through CBS's part-ownership of The CW, KMAX was announced as the network's Sacramento affiliate as part of an 11-station affiliation deal.

On February 22, 2006, News Corporation announced the launch of a new programming service called MyNetworkTV, which would be operated by Fox Television Stations and its syndication division Twentieth Television. MyNetworkTV was created to compete against The CW as well as to give UPN and WB stations that were not mentioned as becoming CW affiliates another option besides converting to independent stations. KQCA affiliated with MyNetworkTV when it launched on September 5, 2006, preempting The WB's last two weeks of programming in the Sacramento market. KMAX began broadcasting The CW when it launched on September 18.

From September 5, 2006, to September 18, 2009, KQCA did not follow MyNetworkTV's standard 8 to 10 p.m. prime time scheduling like other affiliates in the Pacific Time Zone, opting instead to air its programming one hour early from 7 to 9 p.m. followed by The Oprah Winfrey Show from 9 to 10 p.m. as a lead-in for the KCRA-produced 10 p.m. newscast (similarly, CBS owned-and-operated station KOVR, channel 13, has carried that network's programming from 7 to 10 p.m. since it switched to CBS in March 1995). KQCA was also one of five MyNetworkTV affiliates on the West Coast that did not follow the 8 to 10 p.m. scheduling: KRON-TV in San Francisco, KEVU-CD in Eugene, Oregon and KPDX in Portland, Oregon all air MyNetworkTV programs from 9 to 11 p.m., while KMYQ (now KZJO) in Seattle aired its programming from 7 to 9 p.m. until September 13, 2010, when that station moved MyNetworkTV programming to 11 p.m. to 1 a.m. On September 21, 2009, KQCA began airing the MyNetworkTV schedule in pattern until September 19, 2014, when the station moved MyNetworkTV programming to 12 to 2 a.m. on a four-hour delay beginning on the 22nd of that month, which has become an increasingly common fate for the service.

In August 2007, KQCA began carrying Oakland (now Las Vegas Raiders) preseason games, assuming the broadcasting rights from KMAX.

In 2019, KQCA unveiled a new "My 58" logo. While it kept the "My" branding, it eliminated the MyNetworkTV-style logo, further deemphasizing on the programming service.

In 2021, KQCA began carrying Los Angeles Chargers preseason games.

Programming

Syndicated programming
Syndicated programs broadcast on KQCA include The Office, Friends, Maury, The Steve Wilkos Show, The Kelly Clarkson Show, and The Simpsons, among others.

Newscasts

KCRA began producing a nightly 10:00 p.m. newscast for channel 58 in 1993, after NBC ordered KCRA to drop its "early prime" scheduling and 10 p.m. newscast. Prior to affiliating with MyNetworkTV in 2006, the KQCA newscast was produced out of a secondary set within KCRA-KQCA's Television Circle studios. Soon after picking up the MyNetworkTV affiliation, the newscast began to broadcast from KCRA's main news set.

KQCA added a 7 a.m. morning news hour in 1995. This was replaced in 2002 with a simulcast of the Armstrong & Getty Show radio program; this ended five years later, when KQCA restored a morning newscast from KCRA. On February 12, 2007, KCRA began broadcasting its local newscasts in high definition; the KQCA newscasts were included in the upgrade.

Occasionally, as time permits, KQCA may air KCRA's newscasts whenever channel 3 is unable due to prescheduled starts or overruns of NBC Sports telecasts into regular news timeslots (for example, if an NFL football game is scheduled to air at 5 p.m. Sunday on channel 3, KCRA will air its 5 p.m. newscast over on KQCA instead).

On September 22, 2014, the KQCA 10 p.m. newscast was extended from thirty minutes to a full hour, putting it in direct competition with KTXL's and KOVR's already established 10 p.m. newscasts.

A Spanish-subtitled simulcast of KCRA's 5 p.m. newscast was added to the Estrella TV subchannel on September 5, 2017. This newscast was not in direct competition with any Spanish-language newscast in the market until March 18, 2020, when Telemundo owned-and-operated station KCSO-LD launched newscasts at 5 p.m. and 5:30 p.m.

Technical information

Subchannels
The station's ATSC 1.0 channels are carried on the multiplexed digital signals of other Sacramento television stations:

Analog-to-digital conversion
KQCA shut down its analog signal, over UHF channel 58, on June 12, 2009, as part of the federally mandated transition from analog to digital television. The station's digital signal remained on its pre-transition UHF channel 46, using PSIP to display KQCA's virtual channel as 58 on digital television receivers, which was among the high-band UHF channels (52–69) that were removed from broadcasting use as a result of the transition.

ATSC 3.0 lighthouse

On June 15, 2021, KQCA converted to ATSC 3.0, with simulcasts from KCRA-TV, KXTV, KOVR, KUVS-DT and KTXL. Existing channels from KQCA are hosted by KCRA-TV and KTFK-DT.

References

External links
KQCA station website

MyNetworkTV affiliates
Heroes & Icons affiliates
Estrella TV affiliates
ATSC 3.0 television stations
Television channels and stations established in 1986
1986 establishments in California
QCA
Hearst Television